Varmatun (also Romanized as Varmatūn; also known as Varmatān) is a village in Lalehabad Rural District, Lalehabad District, Babol County, Mazandaran Province, Iran. At the 2006 census, its population was 490, in 131 families.

References 

Populated places in Babol County